The 1898 Fort Smith tornado was a tornado which struck the city of Fort Smith, Arkansas, during the night of Tuesday, January 11, 1898. It touched down about 100 miles to the southwest, and struck the city around midnight, killing 55 people and injuring 113. The twister nearly destroyed the newly constructed Fort Smith High School that had opened in fall 1897. Another tornado was also reported that night in Alma, Arkansas.

The Fort Smith tornado is tied with one that struck Warren in 1949 for the deadliest tornado to strike Arkansas. Both tornadoes were estimated to be rated F4 on the Fujita scale.

References

1898 in Arkansas
Fort Smith, Arkansas
Tornadoes in Arkansas
Tornadoes of 1898
1898 natural disasters in the United States
January 1898 events